Edwin Obed Stanard (January 5, 1832 – March 11, 1914) was a nineteenth-century politician, businessman and teacher from Missouri.

Biography

Born in Newport, New Hampshire, Stanard moved to Iowa Territory with his parents in 1836, completed preparatory studies and moved to St. Louis, Missouri in 1853. He taught school in Illinois in 1854 and 1855, graduated from St. Louis Commercial College in 1855, engaged in the commission business in 1856 and later in the milling business in St. Louis. Stanard was elected a Republican to be the 14th Lieutenant Governor of Missouri in 1868, serving from 1869 to 1871, and was elected to the United States House of Representatives in 1872, serving from 1873 to 1875, being unsuccessful for reelection in 1874. Afterward, he engaged in the manufacturing of flour until his death in St. Louis, Missouri on March 11, 1914. He was interred in Bellefontaine Cemetery in St. Louis.

References

External links

1832 births
1914 deaths
People from Newport, New Hampshire
Lieutenant Governors of Missouri
American manufacturing businesspeople
Politicians from St. Louis
People from Iowa
Burials at Bellefontaine Cemetery
Republican Party members of the United States House of Representatives from Missouri
19th-century American politicians
19th-century American businesspeople